Thomas "Tom" Sloan (born March 5, 1946) was a member of the Kansas House of Representatives for the 45th district, which covers Northwestern Douglas County, including western Lawrence. He served from 1995 to 2019. He is a member of the Republican Party.  He previously served in the Kansas State Senate from 1983 to 1985 and 1986 to 1989.

Born in Holyoke, Colorado, Sloan grew up on a farm in rural Colorado.  He received his BA from Syracuse University in 1968, his MA from Michigan State University in 1969, and PhD in Political Science from the University of North Carolina at Chapel Hill in 1977.

Sloan moved to Kansas in the late 1970s when he became an assistant professor at Kansas State University.  Sloan has also worked as Executive Director of Western Resources, Government Affairs Representative for the Getty Oil Company, and associate executive director of the Kansas State Nurses Association.

Sloan has a reputation as a moderate Republican.

Issue positions
Sloan's website lists his legislative priorities as education, health care, energy, and water.

Committee membership
 Vision 2020 (Chair)
 Energy and Utilities
 Government Efficiency and Fiscal Oversight
 Joint Committee on Energy and Environmental Policy

Major Donors
The top 5 donors to Sloan's 2008 campaign:
1. Kansas Medical Society 	$1,000 	
2. Kansans for Lifesaving Cures 	$1,000 	
3. Kansas Contractors Assoc 	$1,000
4. Koch Industries 	$1,000 	
5. AT&T 	$1,000

References

External links
 Official Website
 Kansas Legislature - Thomas Sloan
 Project Vote Smart profile
 Kansas Votes profile
 State Surge - Legislative and voting track record
 Follow the Money campaign contributions:
 1996,1998,2000, 2002, 2004, 2006, 2008

Republican Party members of the Kansas House of Representatives
Living people
1946 births
21st-century American politicians
20th-century American politicians
Syracuse University alumni
Michigan State University alumni
University of North Carolina at Chapel Hill alumni